Caladenia australis, commonly known as southern spider orchid, is a plant in the orchid family Orchidaceae and is endemic to Victoria, although it was also found on one Bass Strait island on one occasion in 1968. It has a single hairy leaf and usually only one creamy-yellow flower with red streaks, the flower on a hairy stalk.

Description

The dorsal sepal curves forward or droops over the rest of the flower. The petals are a similar size and shape to the sepals but lack glandular ends. The petal and sepals spread widely, sometimes drooping near their ends and are a creamy-yellow colour, often with red streaks. The  labellum  is shiny, yellowish with a maroon tip and curves forward, with the tip rolled under at the end. Flowering occurs between September and November and is strongly enhanced by fires the previous summer.

Taxonomy and naming
The species was first formally described by Geoffrey Carr in 1991 and the description was published in Indigenous Flora and Fauna Association Miscellaneous Paper 1. The type specimen was collected on Wilsons Promontory. The specific epithet (australis) is a Latin word meaning "southern".

Distribution and habitat
Caladenia australis mostly grows in near-coastal areas of Victoria and although widespread, is also uncommon. It grows in heath and woodland, usually on sandy soil. There is a single record from the southern part of Flinders Island in 1968.

Conservation
There are insufficient data to make an assessment of the conservation status of southern spider orchid in Victoria but it is listed as "Endangered" under the Tasmanian "Threatened Species Protection Act 1995".

References

australis
Plants described in 1991
Endemic orchids of Australia
Orchids of Victoria (Australia)
Taxa named by Geoffrey William Carr